Pablo Alberto Portillo Heredia (born April 8, 1984 in Mexico City, Mexico) is a Mexican singer and actor.

Portillo was a member of Mexican group Liberacion and later a member of MDO. With MDO, Portillo toured across Latin America, the United States, and Mexico. Portillo was in MDO with Didier Hernández, Abel Talamantez and Alexis Grullon, among others. During Portillo's time in MDO, the group achieved their most successful phase of the MDO era.

Portillo released his first CD, Demasiado, in 2006 which earned him several nominations and awards in Puerto Rico, the United States and Latin America.

In 2007, he recorded his second album and worked in Telemundo's soap opera Pecados Ajenos as Hector, one of the young cast members.

In 2011, he worked with Azteca in Emperatriz.

In 2014, he worked with Azteca in Así en el Barrio como en el Cielo.

References

External links 
https://m.imdb.com/name/nm1196028

 

1984 births
Living people
Mexican pop singers
Singers from Mexico City
Mexican expatriates in the United States
21st-century Mexican singers
21st-century Mexican male singers